The Devonport-Takapuna Local Board covers from Castor Bay, and Sunnynook south to the end of the Devonport Peninsula; it is separated from the Kaipātiki board area by the Northern Motorway. This local board sits in the Auckland Council office buildings on The Strand in Takapuna. These were the North Shore City Council offices until the North Shore City Council was merged into Auckland Council in 2010. It is part of the North Shore Ward of Auckland Council, which also includes the Kaipātiki Local Board.

Demographics

Devonport-Takapuna Local Board Area had a population of 57,975 at the 2018 New Zealand census, an increase of 2,505 people (4.5%) since the 2013 census, and an increase of 5,322 people (10.1%) since the 2006 census. There were 20,760 households, comprising 27,903 males and 30,069 females, giving a sex ratio of 0.93 males per female. The median age was 39.4 years (compared with 37.4 years nationally), with 10,392 people (17.9%) aged under 15 years, 11,553 (19.9%) aged 15 to 29, 26,604 (45.9%) aged 30 to 64, and 9,426 (16.3%) aged 65 or older.

Ethnicities were 69.3% European/Pākehā, 5.5% Māori, 2.5% Pacific peoples, 26.3% Asian, and 3.7% other ethnicities. People may identify with more than one ethnicity.

The percentage of people born overseas was 43.2, compared with 27.1% nationally.

Although some people chose not to answer the census's question about religious affiliation, 52.3% had no religion, 35.8% were Christian, 0.2% had Māori religious beliefs, 1.5% were Hindu, 1.2% were Muslim, 1.6% were Buddhist and 2.0% had other religions.

Of those at least 15 years old, 18,423 (38.7%) people had a bachelor's or higher degree, and 3,798 (8.0%) people had no formal qualifications. The median income was $39,900, compared with $31,800 nationally. 12,798 people (26.9%) earned over $70,000 compared to 17.2% nationally. The employment status of those at least 15 was that 23,724 (49.9%) people were employed full-time, 7,008 (14.7%) were part-time, and 1,431 (3.0%) were unemployed.

Board
It elects 6 board representatives, currently those representatives are:

Election results

2019 results

2016 results

2013 results

Board chairs 
The board chair is the head of the six-person board elected by the board in their first meeting. Often the chair and deputy chair alternate 18 month periods of the three-year term. Grant Gillon was chair followed by George Wood from early 2018.

References

External links
 https://www.neighbourly.co.nz/organisation/devonport-takapuna-local-board

Devonport-Takapuna
Local boards of the Auckland Region